His Wife's Mother can refer to:

 His Wife's Mother (1909 film), a 1909 American silent film directed by D. W. Griffith
 His Wife's Mother (1932 film), a 1932 British film directed by Harry Hughes